Mandira Bedi (born 15 April 1972) is an Indian actress, fashion designer, and television presenter. She gained recognition by playing the titular role in the 1994 television show, Shanti, which was telecast on India's national channel, Doordarshan. In 2019, she played a negative role in the movie Saaho. Bedi also appeared in many Hindi TV serials like Aurat, Dushman and Kyunki Saas Bhi Kabhi Bahu Thi. Following this, she began hosting ICC Cricket World Cups in 2003 and 2007, Champions Trophies in 2004 and 2006 and Indian Premier League for Sony Max.
Bedi has been a promoter of faux leather for PETA. She debuted as a fashion designer during Lakme Fashion Week 2014 with her saree collection. In 2013, Bedi launched her signature sari store.

Early life and family 

Mandira Bedi was born in Calcutta to Verinder Singh and Gita Bedi. She has an elder brother who is a bank investor. She did her schooling at Cathedral and John Connon School, Bombay and graduated from the St. Xavier's College, Bombay. Thereafter, she did her post graduation from Sophia Polytechnic College, Bombay.

Personal life 

Bedi married Raj Kaushal on 14 February 1999. It was announced on 27 January 2011 that the couple are expecting their first child. Bedi gave birth to a boy named Vir on 19 June 2011 at the Lilavati Hospital, Mumbai. In 2013, Bedi and her husband had applied for adopting a girl. On 28 July 2020, they adopted a 4-year old and named her Tara Bedi Kaushal.

Kaushal died on 30 June 2021 due to cardiac arrest.

Filmography

Film

Television

Web series

References

External links 

 
 
 
 

1972 births
Living people
Indian film actresses
Indian television actresses
Indian women television presenters
Indian television presenters
Actresses from Kolkata
Actresses in Hindi television
Actresses in Hindi cinema
Actresses in Malayalam cinema
20th-century Indian actresses
21st-century Indian actresses
Fear Factor: Khatron Ke Khiladi participants
Actresses in Tamil cinema
Actresses in Telugu cinema
Indian Hindus
St. Xavier's College, Mumbai alumni